PECO, formerly the Philadelphia Electric Company, is an energy company founded in 1881 and incorporated in 1929. It became part of Exelon Corporation in 2000 when it merged with Commonwealth Edison's holding company Unicom Corp.

The company has approximately 2,300 employees; its call center and field craft personnel are members of IBEW Local 614.

Electricity and natural gas

PECO operates in southeastern Pennsylvania and provides electricity to about 1.6 million customers and natural gas to over 511,000 customers. The company's electric service area covers all of the city of Philadelphia and Delaware County; most of Bucks, Chester, and Montgomery counties; and the southeastern corner of York County. The company's natural gas service area covers all of Delaware County; most of Bucks, Chester, and Montgomery counties; and a small portion of eastern Lancaster County.

PECO formerly provided electricity to 35,000 customers in portions of Cecil and Harford counties in Maryland through subsidiary Conowingo Power Company. On June 19, 1995, Delmarva Power acquired the Conowingo Power Company service area from PECO.

PECO's distribution line voltages are 4,160 volts and 13,200 volts. Subtransmission voltages are 34,500 volts and 69,000 volts. Transmission line voltages are 138,000 volts, 230,000 volts and 500,000 volts.

PECO's peak electric load occurred on July 22, 2011 and was 8,983 megawatts (MWs) and its highest peak load in the winter season occurred on December 20, 2004 and was 6,838 MW. Residential electric usage makes up about 35 percent of PECO's total electric delivery and half of the annual electric revenue.

PECO's electric sales tend to peak in the summer and winter seasons, driven by air conditioning and heating load respectively when extreme temperatures create greater demand. The company's natural gas sales are generally higher during the winter periods when cold temperatures create demand for heating. Gas usage by residential customers is approximately half of PECO's total deliveries.

The PECO transition period for the competitive electric generation market ended on Dec. 31, 2010, when caps on retail rates and competitive transition charges on customer bills ended. PECO electric rates had been capped for 12 years.  PECO expects to purchase all of its wholesale electricity from competitive market sources subsequent to 2010 with retail customers charged the actual costs of procurement.

According to Exelon SEC Form 10-k for the year 2012:
nuclear energy supplied 53% of power supplied,
fossils and renewables provided 12% of power supplied, and
purchased power provided 35% of power supplied.

Facilities and infrastructure

PECO owns, maintains, and operates:
 of higher-voltage transmission lines
 of underground electrical distribution cable
 of aerial electrical distribution lines
 of natural gas transmission, distribution and service piplines.

The company also owns 29 natural gas city gate stations at locations that link with various interstate pipelines.

The Chester Waterside Station of the Philadelphia Electric Company was constructed in 1916 and listed on the National Register of Historic Places in 2007.

PECO supplies legacy two-phase electric power to sections of Philadelphia where infrastructure upgrades are impracticable. Philadelphia is one of only two cities with in-service two-phase infrastructure.

Revenues
PECO's total assets are valued at $9.8 billion.  The company delivered  of natural gas and 39.5 billion kilowatt-hours of electricity in 2008, generating $5.5 billion in revenue.

PECO's utility business is capital intensive and requires significant investments for the electric and gas delivery systems to ensure adequate capacity and reliability for customers. PECO's anticipated capital expenditures for 2009 are estimated at $400 million—about three-fourths for the electric business, nearly 20 percent for gas, and the rest is common. The company pays about $510 million in local, state and federal income and other taxes annually.

Controversies
In the 1970s through the 1980s, community activist pressure contributed to the delayed opening of nuclear power plants at PECO's Limerick Generating Station and the temporary cancellation of the planned Limerick 2 nuclear power plant, PA. Both Limerick 1 and Limerick 2 were built and producing power by 1990.

In 2015, the Earth Quaker Action Team began protesting PECO to demand that it expand the amount of solar energy that it buys, and to source solar power from North Philadelphia in order to create jobs. PECO purchases enough solar energy to power 2,000 residential households. Twice each year, in March and September, it submits those plans to the Pennsylvania's state regulators for approval. The utility runs the bidding process through a third party for energy suppliers and wholesalers. PECO's sister company, Constellation, is the third largest developer in Pennsylvania of solar installations for commercial, industrial, government and customers, and its parent company, Exelon, has a portfolio of wind-generating power projects across the country. PECO currently generates 0.14% of its energy portfolio from solar energy, but, according to the environmental activists group Earth Quaker Action Team, “...could generate up to 20% of their portfolio from solar.” Sourcing solar energy from rooftop solar panels “...would generate 70 jobs...” or “...could generate up to 4000 new jobs in Philadelphia.”

References

 Exelon Corporate annual report to shareholders, 2008/2009

Further reading
Wainwright, Nicholas B. History of the Philadelphia Electric Company 1881-1961 Published by the Philadelphia Electric Company

External links

 PECO Energy Company website

Exelon
Companies based in Philadelphia
Electric power companies of the United States
Natural gas companies of the United States
2000 mergers and acquisitions
Energy companies established in 1881
1881 establishments in Pennsylvania